The 2009 Subway Fresh Fit 500 was the eighth stock car race of the 2009 NASCAR Sprint Cup Series. It was held on April 18, 2009 at Phoenix International Speedway in Avondale, Arizona.

Background
Phoenix International Raceway is one of five short tracks to hold NASCAR races; the others are Richmond International Raceway, Dover International Speedway, Bristol Motor Speedway, and Martinsville Speedway. The track's turns were banked at 11 degrees, while the front stretch, the location of the finish line, was banked at three degrees. The back stretch, which has a dogleg shape instead of a straight, has 9 degrees of banking. The racetrack has seats for 76,800 spectators.

Before the race, Jeff Gordon led the Drivers' Championship with 1,154 points, followed by Jimmie Johnson in second on 992 points. Kurt Busch was in third on 974 points, Clint Bowyer was fourth with 967 points, and Tony Stewart was fifth on 963 points. Denny Hamlin, Kyle Busch, Carl Edwards, Matt Kenseth, Kasey Kahne rounded out the top ten. In the Manufacturers' Championship, Chevrolet was leading with 48 points, ten points ahead of their rival Ford in second. Toyota, with 37 points, was six points ahead of Dodge in the battle for third. Johnson was the race's defending champion.

Entry list

Qualifying
Martin took the pole at Phoenix with a speed of 133.814 mph, 0.018 seconds in front of second place, Kyle Busch. Kurt Busch took third place 0.23 seconds of the leader and Jeff Gordon and Brian Vickers rounded out the top five.

Race recap
Phoenix International Raceway chaplain Ken Bowers would give out the invocation. Big Machine Records recording artists Kate & Kacey sang the national anthem for this race and future talk show host Michael Strahan delivered the command to start engines 5 minutes after the anthem was sung.

Mark Martin started from the pole and dominated the first one hundred laps of the race, relinquishing the lead only under caution. At this point, the front runners were Martin, Kurt Busch, Kyle Busch, and Tony Stewart. Those four were consistently in the top five for the first two hundred laps. On lap 167, the caution came out for Robby Gordon's wreck and several cars stayed out. By lap 267, all cars that have stayed out have pitted except Dale Earnhardt Jr. On lap 300, Earnhardt made slight contact with Casey Mears and hit the wall. Ryan Newman, during this caution, accidentally stayed out of the pits because of having radio problems. He was the only car that didn't pit. On the restart, Martin blew by Newman and cruised to his first win since August 2005.

Results

References

Subway Fresh Fit 500
Subway Fresh Fit 500
NASCAR races at Phoenix Raceway
April 2009 sports events in the United States